This page lists all described genera and species of the spider family Nesticidae. , the World Spider Catalog accepts 303 species in 16 genera:

A

Aituaria

Aituaria Esyunin & Efimik, 1998
 Aituaria pontica (Spassky, 1932) — Ukraine, Russia (Europe, Urals, Caucasus), Georgia

C

Canarionesticus

Canarionesticus Wunderlich, 1992
 Canarionesticus quadridentatus Wunderlich, 1992 (type) — Canary Is.

Carpathonesticus

Carpathonesticus Lehtinen & Saaristo, 1980
 Carpathonesticus avrigensis Weiss & Heimer, 1982 — Romania
 Carpathonesticus biroi (Kulczyński, 1895) — Romania
 Carpathonesticus birsteini (Charitonov, 1947) — Caucasus (Russia, Georgia)
 Carpathonesticus borutzkyi (Reimoser, 1930) — Ukraine, Turkey, Georgia
 Carpathonesticus caucasicus (Charitonov, 1947) — Georgia
 Carpathonesticus cibiniensis (Weiss, 1981) — Romania
 Carpathonesticus eriashvilii Marusik, 1987 — Ukraine, Georgia
 Carpathonesticus fodinarum (Kulczyński, 1894) (type) — Romania
 Carpathonesticus galotshkae Evtushenko, 1993 — Ukraine
 Carpathonesticus hungaricus (Chyzer, 1894) — Romania
 Carpathonesticus ljovuschkini (Pichka, 1965) — Russia (Caucasus)
 Carpathonesticus lotriensis Weiss, 1983 — Romania
 Carpathonesticus mamajevae Marusik, 1987 — Georgia
 Carpathonesticus orolesi Nae, 2013 — Romania
 Carpathonesticus paraavrigensis Weiss & Heimer, 1982 — Romania
 Carpathonesticus parvus (Kulczyński, 1914) — Bosnia-Hercegovina
 Carpathonesticus puteorum (Kulczyński, 1894) — Romania
 Carpathonesticus racovitzai (Dumitrescu, 1980) — Romania
 Carpathonesticus simoni (Fage, 1931) — Romania
 Carpathonesticus spelaeus (Szombathy, 1917) — Romania
 Carpathonesticus zaitzevi (Charitonov, 1939) — Georgia

Cyclocarcina

Cyclocarcina Komatsu, 1942
 Cyclocarcina floronoides Komatsu, 1942 (type) — Japan
 Cyclocarcina floronoides komatsui (Yaginuma, 1979) — Japan
 Cyclocarcina floronoides notoi (Yaginuma, 1979) — Japan
 Cyclocarcina floronoides tatoro (Yaginuma, 1979) — Japan
 Cyclocarcina linyphoides (Komatsu, 1960) — Japan

D

Domitius

Domitius Ribera, 2018
 Domitius baeticus (López-Pancorbo & Ribera, 2011) (type) — Spain
 Domitius luquei (Ribera & Guerao, 1995) — Spain
 Domitius lusitanicus (Fage, 1931) — Portugal
 Domitius menozzii (Caporiacco, 1934) — Italy
 Domitius murgis (Ribera & De Mas, 2003) — Spain
 Domitius sbordonii (Brignoli, 1979) — Italy
 Domitius speluncarum (Pavesi, 1873) — Italy

E

Eidmannella

Eidmannella Roewer, 1935
 Eidmannella bullata Gertsch, 1984 — USA
 Eidmannella delicata Gertsch, 1984 — USA
 Eidmannella nasuta Gertsch, 1984 — USA
 Eidmannella pachona Gertsch, 1984 — Mexico
 Eidmannella pallida (Emerton, 1875) (type) — North America. Introduced to Pacific Is., Galapagos Is., Macaronesia, Spain, Japan
 Eidmannella reclusa Gertsch, 1984 — USA
 Eidmannella rostrata Gertsch, 1984 — USA
 Eidmannella tuckeri Cokendolpher & Reddell, 2001 — USA

G

Gaucelmus

Gaucelmus Keyserling, 1884
 Gaucelmus augustinus Keyserling, 1884 (type) — North, Central America, Caribbean
 Gaucelmus calidus Gertsch, 1971 — Mexico, Guatemala
 Gaucelmus cavernicola (Petrunkevitch, 1910) — Jamaica
 Gaucelmus pygmaeus Gertsch, 1984 — Panama
 Gaucelmus strinatii Brignoli, 1979 — Guatemala
 Gaucelmus tropicus Gertsch, 1984 — Panama

H

Hamus

Hamus Ballarin & Li, 2015
 Hamus bowoensis Ballarin & Li, 2015 (type) — Tibet
 Hamus cornutus Lin, Ballarin & Li, 2016 — China, Laos
 Hamus kangdingensis Lin, Ballarin & Li, 2016 — China
 Hamus luzon Lin, Ballarin & Li, 2016 — Philippines
 Hamus mangunensis Lin, Ballarin & Li, 2016 — China

K

Kryptonesticus

Kryptonesticus Pavlek & Ribera, 2017
 Kryptonesticus arenstorffi (Kulczyński, 1914) — Montenegro, Croatia
 Kryptonesticus beroni (Deltshev, 1977) — Bulgaria
 Kryptonesticus beshkovi (Deltshev, 1979) — Greece (Crete)
 Kryptonesticus deelemanae Pavlek & Ribera, 2017 — Croatia
 Kryptonesticus dimensis (López-Pancorbo, Kunt & Ribera, 2013) — Turkey
 Kryptonesticus eremita (Simon, 1880) — Europe, Turkey. Introduced to New Zealand
 Kryptonesticus fagei (Kratochvíl, 1933) — Bosnia and Herzegovina
 Kryptonesticus georgescuae Nae, Sarbu & Weiss, 2018 — Romania
 Kryptonesticus henderickxi (Bosselaers, 1998) — Greece (Crete)

N

Nescina

Nescina Ballarin & Li, 2015
 Nescina kohi Lin, Ballarin & Li, 2016 — Singapore
 Nescina minuta Ballarin & Li, 2015 (type) — China

Nesticella

Nesticella Lehtinen & Saaristo, 1980
 Nesticella aelleni (Brignoli, 1972) — Sri Lanka
 Nesticella africana (Hubert, 1970) — Congo
 Nesticella apiculata Liu & Li, 2013 — China
 Nesticella arcuata Liu & Li, 2013 — China
 Nesticella baiseensis Lin, Ballarin & Li, 2016 — China
 Nesticella baobab Lin, Ballarin & Li, 2016 — China
 Nesticella beccus Grall & Jäger, 2016 — Laos, Thailand
 Nesticella benoiti (Hubert, 1970) — Zimbabwe
 Nesticella brevipes (Yaginuma, 1970) — Russia (Far East), China, Korea, Japan
 Nesticella buicongchieni (Lehtinen & Saaristo, 1980) — Vietnam
 Nesticella caeca Lin, Ballarin & Li, 2016 — China
 Nesticella chillagoensis Wunderlich, 1995 — Australia (Queensland)
 Nesticella chongqing Lin, Ballarin & Li, 2016 — China
 Nesticella connectens Wunderlich, 1995 — Malaysia, Thailand
 Nesticella dazhuangensis Lin, Ballarin & Li, 2016 — China
 Nesticella ducke Rodrigues & Buckup, 2007 — Brazil
 Nesticella falcata Liu & Li, 2013 — China
 Nesticella foelixi Grall & Jäger, 2016 — Laos
 Nesticella fuliangensis Lin, Ballarin & Li, 2016 — China
 Nesticella gazuida Lin, Ballarin & Li, 2016 — China
 Nesticella gongshanensis Lin, Ballarin & Li, 2016 — China
 Nesticella gracilenta Liu & Li, 2013 — China
 Nesticella griswoldi Lin, Ballarin & Li, 2016 — Madagascar
 Nesticella helenensis (Hubert, 1977) — St. Helena
 Nesticella hongheensis Lin, Ballarin & Li, 2016 — China
 Nesticella huomachongensis Lin, Ballarin & Li, 2016 — China
 Nesticella jingpo Lin, Ballarin & Li, 2016 — China
 Nesticella kaohsiungensis Lin, Ballarin & Li, 2016 — China
 Nesticella kerzhneri (Marusik, 1987) — Russia (Far East)
 Nesticella laotica Grall & Jäger, 2016 — Laos
 Nesticella lisu Lin, Ballarin & Li, 2016 — China
 Nesticella liuzhaiensis Lin, Ballarin & Li, 2016 — China
 Nesticella machadoi (Hubert, 1971) — Angola
 Nesticella marapu Benjamin, 2004 — Indonesia
 Nesticella michaliki Grall & Jäger, 2016 — Myanmar
 Nesticella mogera (Yaginuma, 1972) — China, Korea, Japan. Introduced to Azerbaijan, Europe, Pacific islands
 Nesticella mollicula (Thorell, 1898) — Myanmar, Thailand
 Nesticella murici Rodrigues & Buckup, 2007 — Brazil
 Nesticella nandanensis Lin, Ballarin & Li, 2016 — China
 Nesticella nepalensis (Hubert, 1973) (type) — India, Nepal, China
 Nesticella odonta (Chen, 1984) — China
 Nesticella okinawaensis (Yaginuma, 1979) — Japan
 Nesticella phami Lin, Ballarin & Li, 2016 — Vietnam
 Nesticella potala Lin, Ballarin & Li, 2016 — China
 Nesticella proszynskii (Lehtinen & Saaristo, 1980) — Indonesia (Java)
 Nesticella qiaoqiensis Lin, Ballarin & Li, 2016 — China
 Nesticella qiongensis Lin, Ballarin & Li, 2016 — China
 Nesticella quelpartensis (Paik & Namkung, 1969) — Korea
 Nesticella renata (Bourne, 1980) — Papua New Guinea (New Ireland)
 Nesticella robinsoni Lehtinen & Saaristo, 1980 — New Guinea
 Nesticella robusta Lin, Ballarin & Li, 2016 — China
 Nesticella rongtangensis Lin, Ballarin & Li, 2016 — China
 Nesticella sanchaheensis Lin, Ballarin & Li, 2016 — China
 Nesticella sechellana (Simon, 1898) — Seychelles
 Nesticella semicircularis Liu & Li, 2013 — China
 Nesticella shanlinensis Liu & Li, 2013 — China
 Nesticella sogi Lehtinen & Saaristo, 1980 — New Guinea
 Nesticella songi Chen & Zhu, 2004 — China
 Nesticella sulawesi Lin, Ballarin & Li, 2016 — Indonesia (Sulawesi)
 Nesticella sumatrana Lin, Ballarin & Li, 2016 — Indonesia (Sumatra)
 Nesticella taurama Lehtinen & Saaristo, 1980 — New Guinea
 Nesticella tibetana Lin, Ballarin & Li, 2016 — China
 Nesticella utuensis (Bourne, 1980) — Papua New Guinea (New Ireland)
 Nesticella vanlang Lin, Ballarin & Li, 2016 — Vietnam
 Nesticella verticalis Liu & Li, 2013 — China
 Nesticella wanzaiensis Lin, Ballarin & Li, 2016 — China
 Nesticella xiongmao Lin, Ballarin & Li, 2016 — China
 Nesticella xixia Lin, Ballarin & Li, 2016 — China
 Nesticella yanbeiensis Lin, Ballarin & Li, 2016 — China
 Nesticella yao Lin, Ballarin & Li, 2016 — China
 Nesticella yui Wunderlich & Song, 1995 — China, Laos
 Nesticella zhiyuani Lin, Ballarin & Li, 2016 — Indonesia (Sumatra)

Nesticus

Nesticus Thorell, 1869
 Nesticus abukumanus Yaginuma, 1979 — Japan
 Nesticus acrituberculum Kim, Yoo, Lee, Lee, Choi & Lim, 2014 — Korea
 Nesticus afghanus Roewer, 1962 — Afghanistan
 Nesticus akamai Yaginuma, 1979 — Japan
 Nesticus akiensis Yaginuma, 1979 — Japan
 Nesticus akiyoshiensis (Uyemura, 1941) — Japan
 Nesticus akiyoshiensis ofuku Yaginuma, 1977 — Japan
 Nesticus ambiguus Denis, 1950 — Tanzania
 Nesticus anagamianus Yaginuma, 1976 — Japan
 Nesticus antillanus Bryant, 1940 — Cuba
 Nesticus archeri Gertsch, 1984 — USA
 Nesticus arganoi Brignoli, 1972 — Mexico
 Nesticus asuwanus Nishikawa, 1986 — Japan
 Nesticus bacchus Estol & Rodrigues, 2017 — Brazil
 Nesticus balacescui Dumitrescu, 1979 — Romania
 Nesticus barri Gertsch, 1984 — USA
 Nesticus barrowsi Gertsch, 1984 — USA
 Nesticus bishopi Gertsch, 1984 — USA
 Nesticus brasiliensis Brignoli, 1979 — Brazil
 Nesticus breviscapus Yaginuma, 1979 — Japan
 Nesticus brignolii Ott & Lise, 2002 — Brazil, Uruguay, Argentina
 Nesticus brimleyi Gertsch, 1984 — USA
 Nesticus bungonus Yaginuma, 1979 — Japan
 Nesticus calilegua Ott & Lise, 2002 — Brazil, Argentina
 Nesticus campus Gertsch, 1984 — Mexico
 Nesticus carolinensis (Bishop, 1950) — USA
 Nesticus carpaticus Dumitrescu, 1979 — Romania
 Nesticus carteri Emerton, 1875 — USA
 Nesticus caverna Gertsch, 1984 — Mexico
 Nesticus cellulanus (Clerck, 1757) (type) — Europe, Turkey. Introduced to North America
 Nesticus cellulanus affinis Kulczyński, 1894 — Hungary
 Nesticus cernensis Dumitrescu, 1979 — Romania
 Nesticus chikunii Yaginuma, 1980 — Japan
 Nesticus citrinus (Taczanowski, 1874) — French Guiana
 Nesticus concolor Roewer, 1962 — Afghanistan
 Nesticus constantinescui Dumitrescu, 1979 — Romania
 Nesticus cooperi Gertsch, 1984 — USA
 Nesticus coreanus Paik & Namkung, 1969 — Korea
 Nesticus crosbyi Gertsch, 1984 — USA
 Nesticus delfini (Simon, 1904) — Chile
 Nesticus diaconui Dumitrescu, 1979 — Romania
 Nesticus dilutus Gertsch, 1984 — USA
 Nesticus echigonus Yaginuma, 1986 — Japan
 Nesticus flavidus Paik, 1978 — Korea
 Nesticus furenensis Yaginuma, 1979 — Japan
 Nesticus furtivus Gertsch, 1984 — USA
 Nesticus gastropodus Kim & Ye, 2014 — Korea
 Nesticus georgia Gertsch, 1984 — USA
 Nesticus gertschi Coyle & McGarity, 1992 — USA
 Nesticus gondai Yaginuma, 1979 — Japan
 Nesticus gujoensis Yaginuma, 1979 — Japan
 Nesticus higoensis Yaginuma, 1977 — Japan
 Nesticus hoffmanni Gertsch, 1971 — Mexico
 Nesticus holsingeri Gertsch, 1984 — USA
 Nesticus inconcinnus Simon, 1907 — São Tomé and Príncipe
 Nesticus ionescui Dumitrescu, 1979 — Romania
 Nesticus iriei Yaginuma, 1979 — Japan
 Nesticus ivone Faleiro & Santos, 2011 — Brazil
 Nesticus iwatensis Yaginuma, 1979 — Japan
 Nesticus jamesoni Gertsch, 1984 — Mexico
 Nesticus jonesi Gertsch, 1984 — USA
 Nesticus kaiensis Yaginuma, 1979 — Japan
 Nesticus karyuensis Yaginuma, 1980 — Japan
 Nesticus kataokai Yaginuma, 1979 — Japan
 Nesticus kunisakiensis Irie, 1999 — Japan
 Nesticus kuriko Yaginuma, 1972 — Japan
 Nesticus kyongkeomsanensis Namkung, 2002 — Korea
 Nesticus latiscapus Yaginuma, 1972 — Japan
 Nesticus latiscapus kosodensis Yaginuma, 1972 — Japan
 Nesticus lindbergi Roewer, 1962 — Afghanistan
 Nesticus longiscapus Yaginuma, 1976 — Japan
 Nesticus longiscapus awa Yaginuma, 1978 — Japan
 Nesticus longiscapus draco Yaginuma, 1978 — Japan
 Nesticus longiscapus kiuchii Yaginuma, 1978 — Japan
 Nesticus maculatus Bryant, 1948 — Hispaniola
 Nesticus masudai Yaginuma, 1979 — Japan
 Nesticus mikawanus Yaginuma, 1979 — Japan
 Nesticus mimus Gertsch, 1984 — USA
 Nesticus monticola Yaginuma, 1979 — Japan
 Nesticus nahuanus Gertsch, 1971 — Mexico
 Nesticus nasicus Coyle & McGarity, 1992 — USA
 Nesticus nishikawai Yaginuma, 1979 — Japan
 Nesticus noroensis Mashibara, 1993 — Japan
 Nesticus orghidani Dumitrescu, 1979 — Romania
 Nesticus paynei Gertsch, 1984 — USA
 Nesticus pecki Hedin & Dellinger, 2005 — USA
 Nesticus plesai Dumitrescu, 1980 — Romania
 Nesticus potreiro Ott & Lise, 2002 — Brazil
 Nesticus potterius (Chamberlin, 1933) — USA
 Nesticus rainesi Gertsch, 1984 — Mexico
 Nesticus rakanus Yaginuma, 1976 — Japan
 Nesticus ramirezi Ott & Lise, 2002 — Brazil, Argentina
 Nesticus reclusus Gertsch, 1984 — USA
 Nesticus reddelli Gertsch, 1984 — Mexico
 Nesticus salta Torres, Pardo, González-Reyes, Rodríguez Artigas & Corronca, 2016 — Argentina
 Nesticus secretus Gertsch, 1984 — USA
 Nesticus sedatus Gertsch, 1984 — Mexico
 Nesticus sheari Gertsch, 1984 — USA
 Nesticus shinkaii Yaginuma, 1979 — Japan
 Nesticus shureiensis Yaginuma, 1980 — Japan
 Nesticus silvanus Gertsch, 1984 — USA
 Nesticus silvestrii Fage, 1929 — USA
 Nesticus sodanus Gertsch, 1984 — USA
 Nesticus sonei Yaginuma, 1981 — Japan
 Nesticus stupkai Gertsch, 1984 — USA
 Nesticus stygius Gertsch, 1984 — USA
 Nesticus suzuka Yaginuma, 1979 — Japan
 Nesticus taim Ott & Lise, 2002 — Brazil
 Nesticus takachiho Yaginuma, 1979 — Japan
 Nesticus tarumii Yaginuma, 1979 — Japan
 Nesticus tennesseensis (Petrunkevitch, 1925) — USA
 Nesticus tosa Yaginuma, 1976 — Japan
 Nesticus tosa iwaya Yaginuma, 1976 — Japan
 Nesticus tosa niyodo Yaginuma, 1976 — Japan
 Nesticus unicolor Simon, 1895 — Venezuela
 Nesticus utatsuensis Tanikawa & Yawata, 2013 — Japan
 Nesticus vazquezae Gertsch, 1971 — Mexico
 Nesticus wiehlei Dumitrescu, 1979 — Romania
 Nesticus yaginumai Irie, 1987 — Japan
 Nesticus yamagatensis Yoshida, 1989 — Japan
 Nesticus yamato Yaginuma, 1979 — Japan
 Nesticus yeongchigulensis Kim, Ye & Kim, 2016 — Korea
 Nesticus yesoensis Yaginuma, 1979 — Japan
 Nesticus zenjoensis Yaginuma, 1978 — Japan

P

Pseudonesticus

Pseudonesticus Liu & Li, 2013
 Pseudonesticus clavatus Liu & Li, 2013 (type) — China
 Pseudonesticus dafangensis Lin, Ballarin & Li, 2016 — China
 Pseudonesticus miao Lin, Ballarin & Li, 2016 — China
 Pseudonesticus spinosus Lin, Ballarin & Li, 2016 — China
 Pseudonesticus wumengensis Lin, Ballarin & Li, 2016 — China
 Pseudonesticus ziyunensis Lin, Ballarin & Li, 2016 — China

S

Speleoticus

Speleoticus Ballarin & Li, 2016
 Speleoticus globosus (Liu & Li, 2013) — China
 Speleoticus libo (Chen & Zhu, 2005) — China
 Speleoticus navicellatus (Liu & Li, 2013) (type) — China
 Speleoticus uenoi (Yaginuma, 1972) — Japan
 Speleoticus yinchangminae Li, 2016 — China

T

Typhlonesticus

Typhlonesticus Kulczyński, 1914
 Typhlonesticus absoloni (Kratochvíl, 1933) (type) — Montenegro
 Typhlonesticus gocmeni Ribera, Elverici, Kunt & Özkütük, 2014 — Turkey
 Typhlonesticus idriacus (Roewer, 1931) — Austria, Italy
 Typhlonesticus morisii (Brignoli, 1975) — Italy
 Typhlonesticus obcaecatus (Simon, 1907) — Spain

W

Wraios

Wraios Ballarin & Li, 2015
 Wraios longiembolus Ballarin & Li, 2015 (type) — China

References

Nesticidae
Nesticidae